The Men's scratch race at the 2018 Commonwealth Games, as part of the cycling programme, took place on 7 April 2018.

Schedule
The schedule was as follows:

All times are Australian Eastern Standard Time (UTC+10)

Results

Qualification
First 12 riders in each heat qualify to final.
Heat 1

Heat 2

Final

References

Men's scratch race
Cycling at the Commonwealth Games – Men's scratch